Bandpass or band-pass may refer to:

Band-pass filter
Bandpass signal
Bandpass sampling

See also

Passband